Rainbow Road may refer to:
Rainbow Road (New Zealand), a back-country road from Hanmer Springs to Saint Arnaud
Rainbow Road (Mario Kart), the final course of the Special Cup in the Mario Kart series of video games
Rainbow Road, a 2005 novel by Alex Sanchez
"Rainbow Road" (song), written by Donnie Fritts and Dan Penn, recorded by several musicians, including Steve Goodman, Arthur Alexander, and Joan Baez
Rainbow Road (album), a 2010 album by Haruka Tomatsu